Mercury sulfate may refer to:

Mercury(I) sulfate (mercurous sulfate), Hg2SO4
Mercury(II) sulfate (mercuric sulfate), HgSO4 and its hydrate